Katsiveli (greek: Κατσιβέλι) is an urban-type settlement in the Yalta Municipality of the Autonomous Republic of Crimea, a territory recognized by a majority of countries as part of Ukraine and illegally annexed by Russia as the Republic of Crimea.

Its population was 658 as of the 2001 Ukrainian census. Current population:

References

Urban-type settlements in Crimea
Seaside resorts in Russia
Seaside resorts in Ukraine
Yalta Municipality